Ugly Duckling (Ugly Duckling – ) is a 2015 Thai television series each presented through one of the four segments entitled Perfect Match, Pity Girl, Don't and Boy's Paradise based on a series of novels published by Jamsai Publishing.

Directed by Chatkaew Susiwa and produced by GMMTV, the premiere segment Perfect Match was broadcast on 17 May 2015 to 12 July 2015, followed by Pity Girl (26 July 2015 to 23 August 2015), Don't (30 August 2015 to 11 October 2015) and Boy's Paradise (25 October 2015 to 20 December 2015), airing on Sundays on GMM 25 at 20:00 ICT.

The series was popular, and was Thailand's second-most searched for item in 2015, according to Google.

Cast and characters

Main

Perfect Match
 Puttichai Kasetsin (Push) as Suea / Leo
 Worranit Thawornwong (Mook) as Junita / Junior

Pity Girl 
 Natcha Janthapan (Mouse) as Aston
 Neen Suwanamas as Alice
 Nachat Juntapun (Nicky) as Fuyu

Don't 
 Jirakit Thawornwong (Mek) as Zero
 Lapassalan Jiravechsoontornkul (Mild) as Maewnam
 Chatchawit Techarukpong (Victor) as Minton

Boy's Paradise 
 Esther Supreeleela as Mami
 Sean Jindachot as CU
 Korn Khunatipapisiri (Oaujun) as Rayji
 Kitkasem Mcfadden (James) as LJ

Supporting

Perfect Match
 Korawit Boonsri (Gun) as Bee
 Akkaranat Ariyaritwikul (Nott) as Rio
 Nat Sakdatorn as a doctor
 Leo Saussay as Max
 Niti Chaichitathorn (Pompam) as a teacher
 Oranicha Krinchai (Proud) as Ning
 Petchbuntoon Pongphan (Louis) as Tot

Pity Girl 
 Jumpol Adulkittiporn (Off) as Tom, Alice's ex-boyfriend
 Thitipoom Techaapaikhun (New) as BM, Chica's boyfriend
 Maripha Siripool (Wawa) as Patti
 Zom Marie as Chicha
 Tatchakorn Boonlapayanan (Godji) as Martha

Don't 
 Lapisara Intarasut (Apple) as Ozone
 Alysaya Tsoi (Alice) as Vivien
 Korapat Kirdpan (Nanon) as Plawan
 Gornpop Janjaroen (Joke) as Maewnam's father

Boy's Paradise 
 Anchasa Mongkhonsamai as Namsom, Mami's friend
 Vichuda Pindum (Mam) as Mami's mother

Guest role

Perfect Match
 Neen Suwanamas as Alice

Pity Girl 
 Worranit Thawornwong (Mook) as Junita / Junior
 Chatchawit Techarukpong (Victor) as Minton
 Lapassalan Jiravechsoontornkul (Mild) as Maewnam

Don't 
 Nachat Juntapun (Nicky) as Fuyu
 Tawan Vihokratana (Tay) as Ter
 Kittipat Chalaruk (Golf) as Doctor

Boy's Paradise 
 Worranit Thawornwong (Mook) as Junita / Junior
 Neen Suwanamas as Alice
 Lapassalan Jiravechsoontornkul (Mild) as Maewnam

References

2010s teen drama television series
Thai romantic comedy television series
GMM 25 original programming
2015 Thai television series debuts
2015 Thai television series endings
Television series by GMMTV